Gudmund Grimstad (8 April 1898 – 12 August 1970) was a Norwegian wrestler. He competed at the 1920 Summer Olympics in Antwerp where he placed fifth in freestyle middleweight.

References

External links
 

1898 births
1970 deaths
Sportspeople from Bodø
Olympic wrestlers of Norway
Wrestlers at the 1920 Summer Olympics
Norwegian male sport wrestlers